Proeulia leonina is a species of moth of the family Tortricidae. It is found in Chile in the Valparaíso and Maule regions.

References

Moths described in 1883
Proeulia
Endemic fauna of Chile